Markinch railway station is a railway station in Markinch, Fife, Scotland, which serves the Glenrothes, Leslie and Levenmouth areas of Fife.

The station was recently rebuilt to include a new building and park and ride facilities and is now the main station for passengers travelling to Glenrothes, Leven, Buckhaven, Methil and the East of Fife. There are up to ten buses an hour connecting the station with Glenrothes and four to the Levenmouth area. A cycle route has also been completed along the former Leslie Railway into Glenrothes.

History 
The now-closed Leslie Railway left the mainline immediately south of this station.

Services 

Southbound has two trains per hour to Edinburgh. There is one direct service from  each weekday evening.

Sunday services are somewhat irregular and run every two hours in the morning and early afternoon but more frequently thereafter. They run to and from Aberdeen or Inverness northbound.

References

External links 

Railway stations in Fife
Former North British Railway stations
Railway stations in Great Britain opened in 1847
Railway stations served by ScotRail
1847 establishments in Scotland
Listed railway stations in Scotland
Category B listed buildings in Fife